Anthony Allen Stacey (born March 25, 1977) is a retired American basketball player and current head coach for Whitmer High School in Toledo. Stacy played college basketball for Bowling Green University, where he was an all-conference college player. He played professionally for several years in Spain's Liga ACB.

Stacey, a 6'4" forward from Elyria, Ohio, played college basketball at Bowling Green from 1996 to 2000.  Stacey averaged 16.0 points and 7.6 rebounds per game as a freshman and was named Mid-American Conference (MAC) Freshman of the Year.  Following an injury-shortened sophomore campaign, Stacey was named first team All-MAC his last two seasons, as well as MAC Player of the Year in 2000.  Stacey finished his college career with 1,938 points.

Following graduation from Bowling Green, Stacey headed to Spain where he enjoyed a nine-year professional career in Spain, including stints in Liga ACB for CB Lucentum Alicante, CB Murcia and Baloncesto León.

In 2011, Stacey began coaching the Medina High School Varsity boys basketball team. This was his first head coaching job after spending two years as an assistant at Lorain High School. After three seasons in Medina, Stacey stepped down in April 2014 to pursue a full-time job in the Sandusky City School District. During his tenure, Medina went 41-33 including going 19-7 in his final season. He became one of three boys basketball coaches in Medina County history to reach the regional finals.

In 2012, Stacey was named to Bowling Green's Hall of Honor and had his jersey number retired.

In April 2014, he began his coaching job at Sandusky High School.

References

External links
Bowling Green Falcons bio
Liga ACB profile

1977 births
Living people
American expatriate basketball people in Spain
American men's basketball players
Baloncesto León players
Basketball coaches from Ohio
Basketball players from Ohio
Bàsquet Manresa players
Bowling Green Falcons men's basketball coaches
Bowling Green Falcons men's basketball players
CB Inca players
CB Lucentum Alicante players
CB Murcia players
High school basketball coaches in the United States
Liga ACB players
Melilla Baloncesto players
People from Elyria, Ohio
Small forwards
Sportspeople from Greater Cleveland